Clavatula quinteni is a species of sea snail, a marine gastropod mollusk in the family Clavatulidae, first described in 2006.

Description
The shell grows to a length of 46 mm.

Distribution
This marine species occurs off Gabon and Angola.

References

External links

quinteni
Gastropods described in 2006